The 1992 24 Hours of Le Mans was the 60th Grand Prix of Endurance, and took place on 20–21 June 1992.  It was also the third round of the Sportscar World Championship.  For this race, both C1 and FIA Cup class cars ran under the C1 category to comply with ACO rules.

Despite the success of the Group C rules, the FIA introduced new '3.5L' rules for the 1991 World Sportscar Championship which meant a new type of sports-prototype.

Official results
Class winners in bold.  Cars failing to complete 70% of the winner's distance marked as Not Classified (NC).

† - #60 Team MP Racing's qualifying times were disallowed after the car was found to be underweight in post-qualifying inspection.

Statistics
 Pole Position - #2 Peugeot Talbot Sport - 3:21.200
 Fastest Lap - #8 Toyota Team Tom's - 3:32.295
 Distance - 4787.2 km
 Average Speed - 199.34 km/h
 Highest Trap Speed — Toyota TS010 - 336 km/h (race), Peugeot 905 – 351 km/h (qualifying)

Le Mans
24 Hours of Le Mans
24 Hours of Le Mans races
24 Hours Of Le Mans, 1992